Hong Kong competed in the 2009 East Asian Games which were held in Hong Kong, China from 5 December 2009 to 13 December 2009. Hong Kong finished fourth on the medal table with 26 gold medals.

References

2009 East Asian Games
Hong Kong at the East Asian Games
2009 in Hong Kong sport